Papadakis is a Greek surname. The female version is Papadaki.

Notable people with surname include:
Andreas Papadakis (1938-2008), Cypriot-born British academic and architectural publisher
Papadakis Publisher, British publisher
Antonios Papadakis (1810-1878), Greek businessman and benefactor to the University of Athens
Antonis Papadakis (1893-1980), Greek musician
Christína Papadáki (born 1973), Greek tennis player
Constantine Papadakis (1946-2009), Greek-American businessman and president of Drexel University
Dimitris Papadakis (born 1966), Cypriot politician and MEP
Eleni Papadaki (1903-1944), Greek actress
Gabriella Papadakis (born 1995), French ice dancer 
Konstantinos Papadakis (pianist) (born 1972), Greek pianist
Konstantinos Papadakis (politician) (born 1975), Greek politician and MEP
Konstantinos Papadakis (basketball) (born 1998), Greek basketball player
Kostas Papadakis (violinist) (1920-2003), Greek folk violinist
Nick Papadakis (born 1943), Canadian footballer
Petros Papadakis (born 1977), American football player and radio host

Fictional
Hannie Papadakis, a character from The Baby-sitters Club

Greek-language surnames
Surnames